Etidocaine, marketed under the trade name Duranest, is an amide-type local anesthetic given by injection during surgical procedures and labor and delivery. Etidocaine has a long duration of activity, and the main disadvantage of using during dentistry is increased bleeding during surgery.

Synthesis

The amide reaction between 2,6-xylidine (1) and 2-bromobutyryl chloride [22118-12-3] (2) gives 2-Bromo-N-(2,6-Dimethylphenyl)Butanamide [53984-81-9] (3). Alkylation with N-Ethylpropylamine [20193-20-8] (4) gives Etidocaine (5).

References

External links 
 Duranest (RxList)

Local anesthetics
Anilides